The 1974 Italian Grand Prix was a Formula One motor race held at Monza on 8 September 1974. It was race 13 of 15 in both the 1974 World Championship of Drivers and the 1974 International Cup for Formula One Manufacturers. The 52-lap race was won by Lotus driver Ronnie Peterson after he started from seventh position. Emerson Fittipaldi finished second for the McLaren team and Tyrrell driver Jody Scheckter came in third.

Qualifying

Qualifying classification 

*Positions with a pink background indicate drivers that failed to qualify

Race

Classification

Championship standings after the race

Drivers' Championship standings

Constructors' Championship standings

Note: Only the top five positions are included for both sets of standings. Only the best 7 results from the first 8 races and the best 6 results from the last 7 races counted towards the Championship. Numbers without parentheses are Championship points; numbers in parentheses are total points scored.

References

Italian Grand Prix
Italian Grand Prix
Grand Prix
Italian Grand Prix